Mick Grøndahl (often spelled Grondahl) (born 7 May 1968) is a Danish-American bass guitarist. Born in Copenhagen, he was raised in Manhattan, New York with his mother and grandmother, Vava.  He is widely known for playing bass guitar and composing on Jeff Buckley's debut album, Grace.

Grøndahl attended Skidmore College where he graduated with a bachelor’s degree in Art History and English. He also played in local bands, playing the local bar scene on Saratoga’s Broadway strip.  He then moved to New York City where he played with several bands. He met Jeff Buckley after seeing him at Columbia University’s Postcrypt Cafe. They played later that Spring of 1993, and he soon joined forces with Buckley. Grøndahl became an integral part of Buckley's live sound, and wrote the songs, "Dream Brother", "Vancouver", "Tongue" and "Edna Frau" which Buckley would sing. Before and after Buckley's death, he played in several bands including Elysian Fields, Beth Orton and the Greenlandic singer Angu. As of 2020 he is living in Denmark with his daughter, recording and performing with the group, "Tongue".

Discography

Albums

 Jeff Buckley: Grace (1994)
 Jeff Buckley: Sketches for My Sweetheart the Drunk (1998)
 Jeff Buckley: Fall in Light (1999)
 Jeff Buckley: Mystery White Boy (2000)
 Jeff Buckley: Live in Chicago (2000)
 Jeff Buckley: Everybody Here Wants You (2002)

References

External links
Mick Grøndahl on Myspace

1968 births
Living people
American people of Danish descent
Skidmore College alumni
20th-century American bass guitarists